Tmesisternus distinctus is a species of beetle in the family Cerambycidae. It was described by Jean Baptiste Boisduval in 1835.

Subspecies
 Tmesisternus distinctus distinctus Boisduval, 1835
 Tmesisternus distinctus contraversus Pascoe, 1867
 Tmesisternus distinctus electus Heller, 1914

References

distinctus
Beetles described in 1835